Bernard Dumot (born 14 August 1950) is a French former professional footballer who played as a midfielder.

Club career 
Dumot joined Paris Saint-Germain in 1972 after having been recommended by the manager Robert Vicot, who had known him at Châteauroux. He took part in the club's promotion from the Division 3 to the Division 2 in his first season, scoring 3 goals in the process. He would also participate in PSG's successive promotion to the Division 1 in 1974.

Dumot's "best hour" came when he was handed a start in the Parisian derby against Red Star in the Division 1. He would leave PSG in 1976, after having made 36 appearances and scored 4 goals in all competitions. After a brief spell at Orléans, he joined Paris FC, where he would retire in 1978.

International career 
Dumot was an amateur international for France.

After football 
Having worked as an apprentice at age 14, Dumot opened a home appliance repair company in Saint-Germain-en-Laye after his retirement. He would open a similar company in the north of France later on.

In 2006, Dumot retired from his previous businesses, and went to live in the Deux-Sèvres department. After having opened a football school, he became the president of US Chey-Chenay-Sepvret, an amateur football club.

References

External links 
 
 

1950 births
Living people
French footballers
Association football midfielders
People from Châteauroux
LB Châteauroux players
Paris Saint-Germain F.C. players
US Orléans players
Paris FC players
Ligue 2 players
French Division 3 (1971–1993) players
Ligue 1 players
French football chairmen and investors
Footballers from Centre-Val de Loire
Sportspeople from Indre